East of the Sun is the second album by American jazz saxophonist Lin Halliday, which was recorded in 1991 and released on Delmark. He leads a quintet with trumpeter Ira Sullivan, pianist Jodie Christian, bassist Dennis Carroll and drummer George Fludas, the same lineup as his debut album Delayed Exposure.

Reception

In his review for AllMusic, Alex Henderson notes "Like its predecessor, East of the Sun makes listeners wish a label had offered Halliday a deal 20 or 30 years earlier."

The Penguin Guide to Jazz states "The second album is a plain-and-simple second helping, but one can't expect fresh initiatives from a seasoned campaigner at this stage: just good, genuine jazz."

Track listing
 "All the Things You Are" (Jerome Kern, Oscar Hammerstein II) – 6:10
 "East of the Sun" (Brooks Bowman) – 5:31
 "I Found a New Baby" (Jack Palmer, Spencer Williams) – 6:16
 "Indian Summer" (Victor Herbert, Al Dubin) – 5:42
 "My Foolish Heart" (Victor Young, Ned Washington) – 8:48
 "Corcovado" (Antônio Carlos Jobim) – 8:16
 "Paradox" (Sonny Rollins) – 6:58
 "Ira's Blues" (Ira Sullivan) – 8:29
 "Will You Still Be Mine" (Matt Dennis, Tom Adair) – 8:17

Personnel
Lin Halliday – tenor sax
Ira Sullivan – trumpet, flugelhorn, tenor sax, flute
Jodie Christian – piano
Dennis Carroll – bass
George Fludas – drums

References

1992 albums
Lin Halliday albums
Delmark Records albums